Salgaocar is a surname. Notable people with the surname include:

Anil Salgaocar (1940–2016), Indian businessman, son of Vasudev
Vasudev Salgaocar (1916–1984), Indian businessman

Indian surnames